Carl Pepper (born 26 July 1980) is an English footballer who plays for Darlington Railway Athletic.

Pepper plays in midfield and his previous clubs include Darlington, for whom he appeared in the Football League. He made his Darlington Railway Athletic debut on 11 August 2007 against Prudhoe.

References

External links

1980 births
Living people
Footballers from Darlington
English footballers
Association football midfielders
Darlington F.C. players
Blyth Spartans A.F.C. players
Tow Law Town F.C. players
Darlington Railway Athletic F.C. players
English Football League players